This is a list of notable Mexican restaurants. Mexican cuisine is primarily a fusion of indigenous Mesoamerican cooking with European, especially Spanish, elements added after the Spanish conquest of the Aztec Empire in the 16th century. The basic staples remain native foods such as corn, beans and chili peppers, but the Europeans introduced many other foods, the most important of which were meat from domesticated animals (beef, pork, chicken, goat and sheep), dairy products (especially cheese) and various herbs and many spices.

Mexican restaurants

Fast food Mexican restaurants

Former Mexican restaurants
 Chi-Chi's
 Don Pablo's
 Mi Mero Mole, Portland, Oregon
 Original Taco House, Portland, Oregon
 Pup 'N' Taco
 Real Mex Restaurants
 Rio Bravo Cantina
 Two Pesos

See also

 Canby Asparagus Farm and Casa de Tamales, Milwaukie, Oregon
 Latin American cuisine
 List of Mexican dishes
 List of restaurants in Mexico
 Lists of restaurants
 Taco stand
 Taquería

References

External links
 

 
Mexican